Lycinus domeyko is a mygalomorph spider of Chile, named after its type locality: Domeyko, Huasco, Region III (Atacama Region). It is the smallest species in the genus. Its size, the size of the bulb, its short embolus and the cymbial setae directed toward the apex distinguish this species from all other Lycinus.

Description
Male: total length ; cephalothorax length , width ; cephalic region length , width ; medial ocular quadrangle length , width ; labium length , width ; sternum length , width . The labium possesses no cuspules. Its sternal sigilla is small, oval and shallow, while its sternum is rebordered. Chelicerae: rastellum is weak, its fang furrow carries about 10 medium-sized denticles. The cheliceral tumescence is rounded and flat. Cephalothorax, legs and palpi are a yellowish-orangish brown colour, while the abdomen with chevron is formed by 6 recurved lines becoming gradually smaller towards the posterior end.

Distribution and Behaviour
Known only from its type locality in Chile.

See also
Spider anatomy
List of Nemesiidae species
Regions of Chile

References

External links

ADW entry

Nemesiidae
Spiders of South America
Spiders described in 1995
Endemic fauna of Chile